Ha Ji-young is a South Korean actress and model. She made her acting debut in the 2003 on KBS 18th Public Bond Comedy. She is known for her roles in Divorce Lawyer in Love, You Call It Passion and The Legend.

Filmography

Television

Film

References

External links 
 
 

Living people
1982 births
South Korean female models
South Korean film actresses
South Korean television actresses